The Antonov An-32 (NATO reporting name: Cline) is a turboprop twin-engined military transport aircraft.

Design and development
The An-32 is essentially a re-engined An-26. It is designed to withstand adverse weather conditions better than the standard An-26. Announced at the May 1977 Paris Air Show, the An-32 is distinguished from its predecessor by engines raised 1.5 m above the wing in order to avoid foreign object damage on rough, unprepared air strips.

The type features high-lift wings with automatic leading-edge slats, large triple-slotted trailing edge flaps and an enlarged tailplane and a very large increase in power, giving improved take-off performance and service ceiling. The high placement of the engine nacelles above the wing allowed for larger diameter propellers, which are driven by 5,100 hp rated Ivchenko AI-20 turboprop engines, providing almost twice the power of the An-26's AI-24 powerplants.

Production from the Government Aircraft Factory in Kyiv, has included 123 aircraft for the Indian Air Force, which ordered the aircraft under strong foreign relations between then USSR leader Leonid Brezhnev and then India leader Indira Gandhi.

The majority of production has been for the Russian and Ukrainian Air Forces, with around 40 per year being built during the late 1980s to early 1990s. The estimated price for a modernised An-32 version is 15 million US dollars.

Production data

Operational history
Operating as a cargo transport over the short and medium range air routes, the An-32 is suitable for air-dropping cargo, passenger carrying, medevac, firefighting, skydiving or paratrooping roles.

Variants

 An-32 : Twin-engined transport aircraft
 An-32A : The first civil variant, the majority of the 36 aircraft built were delivered to various government factory enterprises, for use in transporting assemblies between plants.
 An-32B : Improved version
 An-32B-100 : Modernised version of the An-32B. Maximum takeoff weight (MTOW) increased to 28.5 tons, payload increased to 7.5 tons.
 An-32B-110 : New avionics allowing aircraft to be operated by two crew members. Metric (Russian) avionics variant.
 An-32B-120 : Imperial (non-Russian) avionics variant of An-32B-110.
 An-32B-300 : Version fitted with Rolls-Royce AE 2100 turboprop engines, providing 4,600 hp each.
 An-32LL (Letayushchaya Laboratoriya flying laboratory): The An-32 first prototype was equipped with a large SV-36P eight-bladed propeller and D-236 engine on the port side for testing, in place of the standard engine and propeller. The increased noise produced by the experimental installation (115-120 dB) outweighed the modest gains in performance.
 An-32MP : Marine Patrol version.
 An-32P Firekiller : Aerial firefighting version. Special category type certificate granted on 10 March 1995. A total of eight tons of liquid can be discharged from the two external tanks simultaneously or one after the other. Drops are conducted at 40–50 m above ground level and 240 to 260 km/h. Can be used as a cargo aircraft when not fighting fires.
 An-32V-200 : A tactical transport/cargo aircraft outgrowth from the An-32B-100, with more modern avionics allowing two crew operation. Intended for export; despite reasonable interest few have been sold.
 An-32 RE : Modernised version of the An-32B. MTOW increased to 28.5 tons, payload increased to 7.5 tons. New avionics.

Operators

Military operators
Besides aircraft in service in the Ukrainian and Russian Air Forces, more than 240 An-32 aircraft are being operated in various countries around the world.

 People's Air and Air Defence Force of Angola Operates seven An-32.

 Bangladesh Air Force: Three aircraft received and currently in service with the 3 Squadron 'Unicorns'. Two An-32B & one An-32C. Overhauled and upgraded with life extension by SE PLANT 410 CA of Ukraine.

 Colombian National Army Aviation: Two An-32

 Congolese Air Force: 2 in service

 Ethiopian Air Force: 1 in service

 Indian Air Force: Bought 125 aircraft, 105 are still in service. Entire fleet is undergoing modernization; 35 upgraded An-32s have been delivered by Ukrspetsexport. The upgrades include modern avionics equipment, new oxygen systems and improved crew seats. The remaining aircraft are being upgraded in India. The Indian Air Force plans to replace the An-32s with the Airbus C295Ws.

 Iraqi Air Force: Six An-32B delivered from Ukraine between November 2011 and October 2012, initially used by the 23rd Squadron alongside C-130s. In May 2013, the 33rd Squadron was created to operate Iraq's An-32 fleet.

 Mexican Air Force: One An-32.
 Mexican Navy: One An-32B.

 Peruvian Air Force Three An-32
 Peruvian Army Two An-32B
 Peruvian Naval Aviation One An-32B formerly from Hungary

 Sri Lanka Air Force Four An-32

 Sudanese Air Force Six An-32

Former military operators

 At least six were delivered to the Afghan Air Force from 1987. Three were used by the Taliban Air Force.

 Armenian Air Force One An-32

 Croatian Air Force: Operated two An-32B's. Modernized in 2004 and subsequently retired and put up for sale in 2014 after being declared redundant.

 Military of Ivory Coast one An-32

 Air Force of Equatorial Guinea One An-32 lost in crash in 2008.

 Jordanian Air Force

 Libyan Air Force

 Mexican Air Force
 Mexican Navy

 Military of Rwanda

Civil operators
In July 2016, a total of 25 Antonov An-32 aircraft remained in airline service. The largest operator was Aero Transporte S.A (ATSA) of Peru with four aircraft. Some 16 other airlines operated smaller numbers of the type.

Accidents and incidents
 On 25 March 1986, an Indian Air Force An-32 disappeared over the Arabian Sea on a delivery flight from the Soviet Union (via Muscat, Oman.) No trace was ever found of the aircraft or its three crew and four passengers.
 On 15 July 1990, an Indian Air Force An-32 crashed in the Ponmudi Mountain Range while en route from Tambaram Air Force Station to Thiruvananthapuram in India.
 On 22 November 1995, a Sri Lankan Air Force An-32B which chartered from the Kazakh was shot down during a landing in Jaffna, and all 63 troops aboard killed.
 On 8 January 1996, an An-32 freighter crashed into a crowded marketplace in Kinshasa, Zaire, resulting in the deaths of approximately 237 people on the ground. The crew attempted to abort the takeoff at Kinshasa-N'Dolo Airport after the aircraft failed to gain height. Four of the six crew members survived. Overloading was cited as a possible cause.
 On 28 March 1998, a Peruvian Air Force An-32 carrying the dual civil/military registration OB-1389/FAP-388 and inbound from Tumbes evacuating 50 people stranded by El Niño-driven floods had an engine failure while approaching Piura. As the aircraft was overloaded, the pilot could not maintain height and the An-32 struck three houses of a nearby shantytown and crashed into a canal. While the crew of five survived, 21 passengers died plus one person on the ground.
 On 26 August 2007, a Great Lakes Business Company An-32B carrying nine tons of minerals, 12 passengers, and a crew of three experienced engine trouble after takeoff from Kongolo Airport, Kongolo, Democratic Republic of the Congo, and crashed short of the runway while attempting to return to the airport, killing 14 of the 15 people on board.
 On 10 June 2009, an Indian Air Force An-32 carrying 13 people crashed shortly after it took off from Mechuka in Arunachal Pradesh, a state bordering China. All 13 people on board were reported to have been killed. Soon after the crash, India agreed a $US400 million deal with Ukraine for an An-32 fleet upgrade. This upgrade as reported will extend the life of these transport aircraft by nearly 15 years.
 On 12 December 2014, a Sri Lanka Air Force An-32 carrying five people crashed on approach to land at Rathmalana Airport after taking off from Katunayaka Bandaranayake International Airport. The pilot, co-pilot and two of the aircrew were killed in the crash and the fifth crew member suffered critical injuries and died after six days from the accident due to his injuries.
 On 22 July 2016, an Indian Air Force An-32 travelling from Chennai to Port Blair went missing above the Bay of Bengal with 29 people on board. It left the Tambaram Air Base near Chennai at 8.30 am and disappeared from radar tracking at 9.12 am, 280 km east of Chennai.
 On 3 October 2018 a Sudan Air Force An-32 collided with an Antonov An-30 (also of the Sudan Air Force) at Khartoum International Airport.
 On 3 June 2019, an Indian Air Force An-32 went missing near Arunachal Pradesh shortly after taking off from Jorhat Air Base in Assam in northeastern India. The wreckage of the aircraft was found in Arunachal Pradesh eight days later with 13 found dead on board.

Specifications (An-32)

See also

References

Bibliography

 
 Hoyle, Craig. "World Air Forces Directory". Flight International, Vol. 182 No. 5370. 11–17 December 2012. pp. 40–64. ISSN 0015-3710.
 Hoyle, Craig. "World Air Forces Directory". Flight International, Vol. 184 No. 5419. 10–16 December 2013. pp. 24–51. ISSN 0015-3710.
 Hoyle, Craig. "World Air Forces Directory". Flight International, Vol. 188 No. 5517. 8–14 December 2015. pp. 26–53. ISSN 0015-3710.
 Taylor, John, W.R. Jane's All The World's Aircraft 1988–89. London:  Jane's Information Group, 1988. .
 Thisdell, Dan and Fafard, Antoine. "World Airliner Census". Flight International, Volume 190, No. 5550, 9–15 August 2016. pp. 20–43.

External links
 
 Official Page
 Indian Air Force AN-32 Image Gallery

1970s Soviet cargo aircraft
An-032
1970s Soviet military transport aircraft
India–Soviet Union relations
High-wing aircraft
Aircraft first flown in 1976
Twin-turboprop tractor aircraft